Donaldius is a monotypic genus of Panamanian jumping spiders containing the single species, Donaldius lucidus. It was first described by Arthur Merton Chickering in 1946, and is only found in Panama.

References

Monotypic Salticidae genera
Salticidae
Spiders of Central America